Léonce Ngabo (born 1951) is a Burundian film director. His 1992 film Gito l'ingrat was the first Burundian feature film.

Life
Ngabo studied chemistry, but kept up his musical interests and wrote the screenplay for a short film and a fairy tale. With the support of a Swiss film-maker, he secured an advance for a full-length feature film. The resulting film, Gito l'ingrat, received international attention.

Ngabo is the founder and chairperson of International Festival of Cinema and Broadcasting in Burundi (FESTICAB). He also helped establish the East African Film Network (EAFN) in 2014, and was elected as EAFN's chair.

Filmography

As director
  Gito l'ingrat [Gito the Ungrateful], 1992
 Burundi 1850-1962, 2010

As actor
 Un dimanche à Kigali [A Sunday in Kigali], 2006

References

External links
 

1951 births
Living people
Burundian film directors